Corsini is an Italian surname.

The Corsini family is a princely Florentine family. The emperor Charles IV created the head of the house a count palatine in 1371; the marquisate of Sismano was conferred on them in 1620, those of Casigliano and Civitella in 1629, of Lajatico and Orciatico in 1644, of Giovagallo and Tresana in 1652. In 1730 Lorenzo Corsini, as pope, conferred the rank of Roman princes and the duchy of Casigliano on his family, and in 1732 they were created grandees of Spain.

 Andrea Corsini (cardinal) (1707-1795)
 Saint Andrew Corsini (1302-1373), friar and Bishop Fiesole
 Pope Clement XII (1652-1740), born Lorenzo Corsini
 Neri Corsini (fl. 1170), founder of the Corsini family
 Neri Corsini (died 1377), bishop of Fiesole from 1374 to 1377, see War of the Eight Saints
 Neri Corsini (1614–1678), cardinal from 1664 onwards
 Neri Maria Corsini (1685–1770), nephew of Pope Clement XII, made cardinal by his uncle 1730

Other people with the surname Corsini:
 Bruno Henrique Corsini, simply known as Bruno Henrique (born 1989), Brazilian professional footballer 
 Catherine Corsini (born 1956), French film director
 Claudia Corsini (born 1977), Italian Olympic pentathlete
 Filippo Corsini (1873-1926), Italian Liberal Party politician
 Giulio Corsini (1933–2009), Italian professional football player and coach
 Harold Corsini (1919–2008), American photographer
 Ignacio Corsini (1891–1967), Italian-born Argentine folklore and tango musician
 Ludovico Corsini (born 1993), Italian Mozambican swimmer specializing in breaststroke
 Maria Corsini (1884–1965), Italian writer, beatified by Pope John Paul II on 2001
 Miriam Corsini (born 1989), Mozambican swimmer specializing in breaststroke
 Raymond "Ray" J. Corsini (1914–2008), encyclopedist and lexicographer in the field of psychology
 Tommaso Corsini (1835-1919), Italian politician

See also
 Palazzo Corsini, Rome
 Palazzo Corsini, Florence

References

Italian-language surnames